Evangelista Cunzi (born 4 May 1984) is an Italian professional footballer who plays as a winger for Serie D club Lamezia Terme.

Club career
On 4 September 2021, he signed with Serie D club Santa Maria Cilento.

References

External links

1984 births
Living people
Footballers from Naples
Italian footballers
Association football midfielders
Serie B players
Serie C players
Serie D players
U.S. Catanzaro 1929 players
S.S. Fidelis Andria 1928 players
A.S.D. Cassino Calcio 1924 players
S.S.D. Città di Gela players
L'Aquila Calcio 1927 players
S.S. Ischia Isolaverde players
Casertana F.C. players
Paganese Calcio 1926 players
S.S. Turris Calcio players
Latina Calcio 1932 players
A.S.D. Sorrento players
A.C.R. Messina players
F.C. Lamezia Terme players